The sea chubs, also known as rudderfish and pilot fish and in Hawaiian as enenue or nenue, are a family, Kyphosidae, of fishes in the order Perciformes native to the Atlantic, Indian and Pacific Oceans usually close to shore in marine waters.

Subfamilies and genera
The four subfamilies with 12 genera in this family are:
 Girellinae Gill, 1862 (nibblers)
 Genus Girella Gray, 1835
 Genus Graus (genus) Philippi, 1887
 Kyphosinae Jordan, 1887 (rudderfishes)
 Genus Kyphosus Lacepède, 1801
 Microcanthinae Bleeker, 1876 (microanthines)
 Genus Atypichthys Günther, 1862
 Genus Microcanthus Swainson, 1839
 Genus Neatypus Waite, 1905
 Genus Tilodon Thominot, 1881
 Scorpidinae Günther, 1860 (halfmoons)
 Genus Bathystethus Gill, 1893
 Genus Labracoglossa Peters, 1866
 Genus Medialuna Jordan & Fesler, 1893
 Genus Neoscorpis J.L.B. Smith, 1931
 Genus Scorpis Valenciennes 1832

Alternative classification
Some authorities raise the subfamilies to full family status as the families Girellidae, Kyphosidae, Microacanthidae and Scorpididae and do not support the monophyly of the Kyphosidae as outlined above.

Timeline

References 

 
Taxa named by David Starr Jordan